Kass Chanatar is a valley located next to the city of Bhimber in Azad Kashmir near the border of Punjab, Pakistan and Jammu and Kashmir.

Geography 
Villages occupy both sides. The relatively low lying foothills of the Himalayan ranges have been adapted to grow crops such as corn and wheat. The valley lies at an average elevation of 390 meters. A stream flows between the valley during monsoon. The animals located in this valley include jackals, wild pigs, eagles, goats, buffalo and crows. 

Nearby villages include Bhimber (1.9 km west), Makahal (2.03 km south west), Khamb (2.08 km west), Potosial (2.14 km north), Dharian (2.39 km north west). Other villages include:

 Gurah Mehran
 Chini Dakki
 Gurah Chadian
 Gurah Nala
 Gurah Bagh
 Gurah Naka
 Gurah Thothal
 Gurah Mughlaan
 Gurah Kalai
 Gurah Khaibrian
 Gurah Dairi
 Gurah Kanjal
 Chatta
 Gurah Jhandi

Economy 
Most of the villagers rely on home grown produce to survive. Crops include corn and wheat.

Infrastructure 
Electricity, phone service and television arrived in the early twenty-first century. 

Chanatar Kas is a stream located in the area.

Demographics 
A  area around Kas Chanatar has an approximate population of 342900 (0.003429 persons per square meter)

History 
Mughal remains can be seen throughout the valley. Mughal Emperors ruled these lands. Walls made by them using stones are the most significant remains seen in this area.

Caste 
Jatts are 99% of the population. Other castes are mainly Butt and Rajputt.

References

External links
The Great Mughal Emperors of India 1526 - 1707 

Populated places in Bhimber District
Valleys of Azad Kashmir